Shipyard Acres was an unincorporated community in Napa County, California. It lies at an elevation of 33 feet (10 m).

History
Shipyard Acres was a wartime neighborhood with a peak population of over 2,550. Residents lived in nearly 400 plywood houses that were built to primarily house families of workers involved in building a variety of ships at Basalt Rock Company for World War II effort. Basalt Rock Company. Other residents worked at Mare Island Naval Shipyard, Napa State Hospital, Travis Air Force Base, the Benicia Arsenal as well as other private industries.  Many residents of the development had moved from Arkansas, Oklahoma, Missouri and Texas as well as other states in order to seek employment.    The development sprang up in 1943 and was dismantled in the mid-1950s. It was located at the northwest corner of what is now Kaiser Road and Napa-Vallejo Highway. Some of the structures were moved a few miles west to the Cuttings Wharf area, resurrected, and were still in place until 2012.

References

Unincorporated communities in Napa County, California
Unincorporated communities in California
Former settlements in Napa County, California